Harold Frederick Neville Gye (22 May 1887 — 25 November 1967), who published under the name Hal Gye, was an author of cartoons, illustrations and articles for early Australian newspapers and journals. Gye provided the artwork for The Songs of a Sentimental Bloke by Australian novelist and poet C. J. Dennis.

In Hall Gye: The Man and His Work (1985, p 3), Elizabeth Lane, who knew Hal Gye personally, says his name 'was pronounced "Ji" (he was most particular about this)', with a soft-g initial-sound, rhyming with "eye".

Gye was born on 22 May 1887 at Ryde, New South Wales. He exhibited a flair for humour and dabbled in poetry, writing over sixty pieces.

Submitting articles and illustrations to The Bulletin, several appeared to have been written as James Hackston, his nom-de-plume.  His works include political cartoons and other illustrations, later exhibiting oil paintings and publishing articles; the latter were collected as Father Clears Out (1966).

Gye also provided illustrations for an anthology of Scottish Border poet and Australian bush balladeer Will H. Ogilvie (1869–1963), with The Australian and other verses (1916) frontispiece and title page.  Work was also undertaken for poet and writer Andrew Barton 'Banjo' Paterson.

The autobiography The Hole in the Bedroom Floor (1969) was published after his death in 1967.

References

External links

 
 

1887 births
1967 deaths
Australian cartoonists
Australian male short story writers
People from New South Wales